Leafwood Publishers (founded in 2000) is an imprint of Abilene Christian University Press located in Abilene, Texas.

History
Leafwood Publishers was founded in 2000 by C. Leonard Allen in Orange, California. By 2004, it was moved in Siloam Springs, Arkansas near John Brown University. In 2005, Leafwood Publishers was purchased by Abilene Christian University Press and was relocated to Abilene, Texas where it currently is located.

Notable authors
Edward Fudge
Sally Gary
Gary Holloway
Rubel Shelly
Darryl Tippens

References

External links

Abilene Christian University
Publishing companies established in 2000
American companies established in 2000
Christian publishing companies
Book publishing companies based in Texas